Atlético Clube Cucujães is a Portuguese sports club from Vila de Cucujães, Oliveira de Azeméis.

The men's football team plays in the I Norte league of AF Aveiro. The team was promoted to the third tier in 1995, remaining in the Segunda Divisão B from 1995 to 2002, with an immediate relegation from the 2001–02 Terceira Divisão following thereafter.

References

Football clubs in Portugal
Association football clubs established in 1922
1922 establishments in Portugal
Oliveira de Azeméis